The Historic Centres of Berat and Gjirokastër encompasses the cities of Berat and Gjirokastër in southern Albania. Gjirokastër was added to the UNESCO World Heritage Site list in 2005 while Berat was added as a site extension in 2008. They are inscribed as rare examples of an architectural character typical of the Ottoman period.

Berat is often referred as the city of a thousand windows and considered one of the architectural treasures of Albania. Traces from Illyrians, Greeks, Romans, Byzantines and Ottomans are still evident and well preserved in the city with castles and mansions, old churches and mosques and impressive wall paintings, icons and murals. Throughout the centuries, Berat was the place where various religions and communities coexisted in peace.  
 
Gjirokastër, referred as the city of stone, stretches on the steep side of the Drino River valley overlooking the historic landscape with picturesque stone architecture framed by mountains at every side. As most of other cities in Albania, Gjirokastër bears architectural treasures of various civilizations that previously conquered the region.

Attractions

Berat

See also 
 Culture & Architecture of Albania 
 List of World Heritage Sites in Albania

References 

 

 
 
World Heritage Sites in Albania
Historic districts
 
 
Tourism in Albania
Tourist attractions in Albania
 
Tourist attractions in Gjirokastër County